Loganlea Reservoir is a small reservoir in the Pentland Hills, Midlothian, Scotland, UK. The Logan Burn connects the reservoir with Glencorse Reservoir.

History
The reservoir was constructed by the Edinburgh Water Company under the provisions of an Act of Parliament obtained in 1847, and was completed in 1851.

Bibliography

References

External links

Gazetteer for Scotland entry on Loganlea Reservoir

See also
List of places in Midlothian

Reservoirs in Midlothian